Brian Cyr (born June 30, 1956) is a Canadian-American former professional darts player who competed in events of the British Darts Organisation (BDO).

Career
Cyr is a two-time winner of the Canadian National Championship in 1999 and 2006. The latter title earned him a spot in the 2007 PDC World Darts Championship where he beat Barrie Bates to reach the second round in which he lost to Rico Vonck. Cyr is a winner of the 2013 PEI Potato Open Men's Singles Champion where he beats Stephen Clements.

World Championship results

PDC
 2007: Second round (lost to Rico Vonck 2–4)

Sources
2006 Canadian national champ
BBC results
Brian Cyr's darts database

1956 births
Canadian darts players
Living people
People from New Glasgow, Nova Scotia
British Darts Organisation players
Professional Darts Corporation associate players